Reviver is the third album by Callers.

Reception 

Reviewers noted that the band had moved past the spare simplicity of their debut Fortune, but there was little consensus otherwise.

Track listing
All songs written by Callers.

"Good Years" – 3:56
"Heroes" – 4:47
"Your Finest" – 3:27
"Crush Times" – 5:15
"Long Control" – 2:57
"Reviver" – 3:44
"Turning" – 5:55
"It's a Ringer" – 2:57
"Antenna" – 3:33
"Howard 2 Hands" – 4:09

Personnel
 Sara Lucas – vocals, guitar
 Ryan Seaton – guitars, vocals, keyboards
 Don Goodwin – drums, percussion, Wurlitzer

References

2012 albums
Callers albums
Partisan Records albums